Shipton's mountain cavy (Microcavia shiptoni) is a species of rodent in the family Caviidae. It is endemic to Argentina.

References

Cavies
Mammals of Argentina
Mammals of the Andes
Endemic fauna of Argentina
Mammals described in 1925
Taxonomy articles created by Polbot
Taxa named by Oldfield Thomas